The Abbot of Jedburgh (previously Prior of Jedburgh, later Commendator of Jedburgh) was the head of the Augustinian canons of Jedburgh Abbey, Roxburghshire. It was founded by King David I of Scotland in 1138, and David's grandson and successor Máel Coluim IV ensured its promotion to the status of abbey before 1156. The position was secularized in the 16th century, and in 1606 turned into a secular lordship for the last commendator, Alexander Home, now earl of Home. 
 
The following is a list of priors, abbots and commendators:

List of priors
 Daniel, fl. 1139
 Osbert, 1153x1156-1174

List of abbots
 Osbert (same), 1153 x 1156-1174
 Richard, 1174-1192
 Radulf, 1192-1205
 Hugh, 1205-1209x1211
 Peter, 1220
 Henry, 1239
 Philip, 1239-1249
 Robert de Gyseburne, 1249
 Nicholas de Prenderlathe, 1249–1275.
 John Morel, 1275–1296, 1299 ? 
 William de Jarum, 1296-1319
 Robert Marshal, 1319-1332
 John de Eskdale, 1338-1354
 Robert, 1358-1392
 John de Dryden, 1408
 Thomas de Eskdale, 1411
 Walter Pyle, 1422-1455
 John de Bolden, 1426
 Andrew Bontoun (or Bolton), 1463-1464 x 1468
 John Woodman, 1468-1476
 Robert Turnbull, 1476-1478
 John Hall, 1478-1479
 William Forester, 1480/81-1484
 Hugh Douglas, 1482
 Robert Archison (Atkinson), 1483-1488
 Thomas Cranston, 1484-1501
 Robert Blackadder, 1484, 1502-1505
 Henry Alanson, 1505-1512
 John Lynne (or John Home), 1512-1549

List of commendators
 Andrew Home, 1547-1593
 Alexander Home, 1597-1606

Notes

Bibliography
 Watt, D.E.R., Fasti Ecclesiae Scotinanae Medii Aevi ad annum 1638, 2nd Draft, (St Andrews, 1969), p. 92
 Watt, D.E.R. & Shead, N.F. (eds.), The Heads of Religious Houses in Scotland from the 12th to the 16th Centuries, The Scottish Records Society, New Series, Volume 24, (Edinburgh, 2001), pp. 116–20

See also
 Earl of Home
 Jedburgh Abbey

Canonical Augustinian abbots and priors
People associated with the Scottish Borders
Scottish abbots
History of the Scottish Borders
Jedburgh